Dylan Alcott defeated Andrew Lapthorne in the final, 6−0, 6−2 to win the inaugural quad singles wheelchair tennis title at the 2019 Wimbledon Championships. With the win, Alcott completed a non-calendar-year Grand Slam and the career Super Slam.

Seeds

Draw

Finals

References

External links
 WC Quad Singles

2019 Wimbledon Championships
Wimbledon Championships, 2019 Quad Singles